Dmitri R. Yafaev (Дмитрий Рауэльевич Яфаев; born 2 January 1948) is a Russian-French mathematical physicist.

At the University of Leningrad (now renamed Saint Petersburg State University) Yafaev received his Russian Candidate degree (Ph.D.) in 1973 with thesis advisor Mikhail Birman and was a lecturer from 1973 to 1977. From 1977 to 1990 Yafaev was a researcher and senior researcher at the St. Petersburg Branch of the Steklov Institute of Mathematics. At the University of Nantes he was an associate professor from 1990 to 1992. Since 1992 he is a full professor at the University of Rennes 1.

Yafaev's research deals with "spectral theory of differential operators; spectral properties of scattering matrices; long-range scattering theory; magnetic Hamiltonians". He is the author of three books and numerous articles. He is on the editorial boards of several journals, including Integral Equations and Operator Theory.

He was an invited speaker in 1998 of the International Congress of Mathematicians in Berlin and in 2003 at the 14th International Congress on Mathematical Physics in Lisbon.

Selected publications

Articles

Books

References

1948 births
Living people
Russian physicists
20th-century French physicists
21st-century French physicists
20th-century Russian mathematicians
21st-century Russian mathematicians
20th-century French mathematicians
21st-century French mathematicians
Saint Petersburg State University alumni
Academic staff of the University of Rennes